The Taking of Pelham One Two Three (also known as The Taking of Pelham 1 2 3) is a 1974 American crime drama film directed by Joseph Sargent, produced by Gabriel Katzka and Edgar J. Scherick, and starring Walter Matthau, Robert Shaw, Martin Balsam, and Héctor Elizondo. Peter Stone adapted the screenplay from the 1973 novel of the same name written by Morton Freedgood under the pen name John Godey.

The title is derived from the train's radio call sign, which is based upon where and when the train began its run; in this case, the train originated at the Pelham Bay Park station in the Bronx at 1:23 p.m. For several years after the film was released, the New York City Transit Authority would not schedule any train to leave Pelham Bay Park station at 1:23.

The film received critical acclaim and holds a rating of 100 percent on Rotten Tomatoes, based on 41 reviews. Several critics called it one of 1974's finest films, and it was a box office success. As in the novel, the film follows a group of criminals taking the passengers hostage inside a New York City Subway car for ransom. Musically, it features "one of the best and most inventive thriller scores of the 1970s".  It was remade in 1998 as a television film and was again remade in 2009 as a theatrical film.

Plot

In New York City, four men wearing similar disguises and carrying concealed weapons board the same downtown 6 train, Pelham 1-2-3, at different stations. Using the codenames Mr. Blue, Mr. Green, Mr. Grey, and Mr. Brown, they take 18 people, including the conductor and an undercover police officer, hostage in the first car.

Communicating over the radio with New York City Transit Police lieutenant Zachary Garber, Blue demands a $1 million ransom to be delivered exactly within one hour or he will kill one hostage for every minute it is late. Green sneezes periodically, to which Garber always responds, "Gesundheit". Garber, Lt. Patrone and others cooperate while speculating about the hijackers' escape plan. Garber surmises that one hijacker must be a former motorman since they were able to uncouple the head car and park it down the tunnel below 28th Street.

Conversations between the hijackers reveal that Blue is a former British Army Colonel and was a mercenary in Africa; Green was a motorman caught in a drug bust; and Blue does not trust Grey, who was ousted from the mafia for being erratic. Just then, Grey shoots and kills a supervisor sent from Grand Central as he approaches the stalled train.

The ransom is transported uptown in a speeding police car that crashes well before it reaches 28th Street. As the deadline is reached, Garber bluffs Blue by claiming that the money has reached the station entrance and just has to be walked down the tunnel to the train. Meanwhile a police motorcycle arrives with the ransom. As two patrolmen carry the money down the tunnel, one of many police snipers in the tunnel shoots at Brown, and the hijackers exchange gunfire with the police. In retaliation, Blue kills the conductor.

The money is delivered and divided among the hijackers. Blue orders Garber to restore power to the subway line, set the signals to green all the way to South Ferry, and clear the police from stations along the route. Before the process is complete, however, Green moves the train farther south. When Garber becomes alarmed, Blue explains that he wanted more distance from the police inside the tunnel.

The hijackers override the dead-man's switch so that the train will run without anyone at the controls. Garber joins Inspector Daniels above ground where the train stopped. The hijackers set the train in motion and get off. As the hijackers walk to the tunnel's emergency exit, the undercover officer jumps off the train and hides between the rails. Unaware that the hijackers have left the train, Garber and Daniels drive south above the train's route. With no one at the controls, the train gains speed.

The hijackers collect their disguises and weapons for disposal, but Grey refuses to surrender his gun, resulting in a stand-off with Blue, who shoots him dead. The undercover officer shoots and kills Brown and exchanges fire with Blue, while Green escapes through the emergency exit onto the street.

Garber, contemplating the train's last suspicious movement, concludes that the hijackers bypassed the dead-man feature and are no longer on board. He returns to where the train had stopped, enters the same emergency exit from street level, and confronts Blue as he is about to kill the undercover officer. With no escape, Blue deliberately places his foot against the third rail and electrocutes himself.

Meanwhile, Pelham 1-2-3 hurtles through the southbound tunnel. When it enters the South Ferry loop, its speed triggers the automatic safeties. It screeches to a halt, leaving the hostages bruised but safe.

Since none of the three dead hijackers was a motorman, Garber surmises that the lone survivor must be. Working their way through a list of recently discharged motormen, Garber and Patrone knock on the door of Harold Longman (Green). After hastily hiding the loot, Longman lets them in, bluffs his way through their interrogation, and complains indignantly about being suspected. Garber vows to return with a search warrant. As Garber closes the apartment door behind him, Longman sneezes, and Garber reflexively says "Gesundheit", as he had over the radio. Garber re-opens the door and gives Longman a knowing, caustic stare.

Cast

 Walter Matthau as Lieutenant Zack Garber
 Robert Shaw as Bernard Ryder / Mr. Blue
 Martin Balsam as Harold Longman / Mr. Green
 Héctor Elizondo as Giuseppe Benvenuto / Joe Welcome / Mr. Grey
 Earl Hindman as George Steever / Mr. Brown
 James Broderick as Denny Doyle, train motorman
 Dick O'Neill as Frank Correll
 Lee Wallace as Mayor Al
 Tom Pedi as Caz Dolowicz
 Beatrice Winde as Mrs. Jenkins
 Tony Roberts as Deputy mayor Warren LaSalle
 Doris Roberts as Jessie, Mayor Al's Wife
 Jerry Stiller as Lieutenant Rico Patrone
 Nathan George as Patrolman James
 Rudy Bond as Police commissioner Phil
 Kenneth McMillan as Borough commander Harry
 Julius Harris as Deputy chief inspector Daniels
 William Snickowski as The Hippie, an undercover police officer
 Jerry Holland as Bud Carmody, train conductor
 Thomas Barbour as T.A. Chairman Barney
 Marvin Silbersher as Comptroller Sid
 Alex Colon as The Delivery boy
 Christopher Murney as Dispatcher
 Robert Weil as Marino
 Sal Viscuso as Patrolman O’Keefe
 Burtt Harris as Patrolman Ricci
 Tony Fasce as Patrolman Wentworth
 Neil Brooks Cunningham as Patrolman Miskowsky
 Joe Seneca as Police sergeant
 Conrad Yama as Mr. Tomashita
 Sho Onodera as Mr. Matsumoto
 Toru Nagai as Mr. Yashimura
 Tura Nakamura as Mr. Nakabashi
 Bill Cobbs as Man on platform
 Dolph Sweet as Police captain Costello (voice)

Production
Godey's novel was published in February 1973 by Putnam, but Palomar Productions had secured the film rights, and Dell had bought the paperback rights months earlier in September 1972. The paperback rights sold for $450,000.

Godey (Morton Freedgood) was a "subway buff". The novel and the film came out during the so-called "Golden Age" of skyjacking in the United States from 1968 through 1979. Additionally, New York City was edging toward a financial crisis; crime had risen citywide (as depicted in the contemporaneous film Death Wish); and the subway was perceived as neither safe nor reliable.

At first, the Metropolitan Transportation Authority (MTA) refused to cooperate with the filmmakers. Godey's novel was more detailed about how the hijackers would accomplish their goal and recognized that the caper's success did not rely solely on defeating the "deadman feature" in the motorman's cab. Screenwriter Stone, however, made a fictional override mechanism the linchpin of the script. Director Sargent explained, "We're making a movie, not a handbook on subway hijacking ... I must admit the seriousness of Pelham never occurred to me until we got the initial TA reaction. They thought it potentially a stimulant—not to hardened professional criminals like the ones in our movie, but to kooks. Cold professionals can see the absurdities of the plot right off, but kooks don't reason it out. That's why they're kooks. Yes, we gladly gave in about the 'deadman feature'. Any responsible filmmaker would if he stumbled onto something that could spread into a new form of madness."

For several years after the film was released, the New York City Transit Authority would not schedule any train to leave Pelham Bay Park station at 1:23. Although this policy was eventually rescinded, dispatchers have generally avoided scheduling a Pelham train at 1:23 p.m. or a.m.

Sargent said, "It's important that we don't be too plausible. We're counting on the film's style and charm and comedy to say, subliminally at least, 'Don't take us too seriously. The credits have a disclaimer that the Transit Authority did not give advice or information for use in the film.

After eight weeks of negotiations, and through the influence of Mayor John Lindsay, the MTA relented, but required that the producers take out $20 million in insurance policies, including special "kook coverage" in case the movie inspired a real-life hijacking. This was in addition to a $250,000 fee for use of the track, station, subway cars, and TA personnel.

The TA also insisted that no graffiti appear in the film. "New Yorkers are going to hoot when they see our spotless subway cars", Sargent said. "But the TA was adamant on that score. They said to show graffiti would be to glorify it. We argued that it was artistically expressive. But we got nowhere. They said the graffiti fad would be dead by the time the movie got out. I really doubt that." Mayor Lindsay had first announced his intention to remove graffiti from subway trains in 1972, but the last graffiti-covered car was not removed from service until 1989.

Other changes included beefing up Matthau's role. In the novel, Garber is the equivalent of the Patrone character in the film. "I like the piece", Matthau said. "It moves swiftly and stays interesting right down to the wire. That's the reason I wanted to do it. The TA inspector I play is really a supporting role—they built it up a bit when I expressed interest in it—but it's still secondary." In the novel, Inspector Daniels confronts Mr. Blue in the tunnel during the climax. Additionally, screenwriter Peter Stone gave the hijackers their color code names, with hats whose colors matched their code names, and the Longman character his telltale cold.

Filming began on November 23, 1973, and was completed in late April 1974. The budget was $3.8 million.

Filming locations
Production began with scenes inside the subway tunnel. These were filmed over the course of eight weeks on the local tracks of the IND Fulton Street Line at the abandoned Court Street in Brooklyn. Closed to the public in 1946, it became a filming location and later home to the New York Transit Museum. Among other films, the Court Street station was used for The French Connection (1971), Death Wish (1974), and the 2009 remake of Pelham.

The production company set up chess boards, card tables, and ping pong tables along the Court Street platform for cast and crew recreation between set-ups. Robert Shaw apparently beat all comers in ping pong.

Although this was an abandoned spur of track, passing A, E, and GG trains rumbled through adjacent tracks on their regular schedules. Dialogue that was marred by the noise was later post-dubbed. The third rail, which carries 600 volts of direct current, was shut off, and three protective bars were placed against the rail, but the cast and crew were told to treat it as if it were still live. "Those TA people ... are super careful", Sargent said. "They anticipate everything. By the fifth week we were dancing our way through those tunnels like nobody's business. They were expecting that, too. That's when they told us of the fatalities in the tunnels. They're mostly old-timers. The young guys still have a healthy fear of the place."

"There was one scene where Robert Shaw was to step on the third rail", Sargent recalled. "When we were rehearsing the scene, Shaw accidentally stubbed his toe and the sparks from his special-effects boot flew everywhere. He turned white as a sheet. We had eight weeks of that. I think we got out just in time. It was like coal mining."

According to a notation on IMDb, the crew wore surgical masks during the tunnel scenes. Shaw's biographer, John French, reported: "There were rats everywhere and every time someone jumped from the train, or tripped over the lines, clouds of black dust rose into the air, making it impossible to shoot until it had settled."

Matthau, who had one scene in the tunnel, said, "There are bacteria down there that haven't been discovered yet. And bugs. Big ugly bugs from the planet Uranus. They all settled in the New York subway tunnels. I saw one bug mug a guy. I wasn't down there a long time—but long enough to develop the strangest cold I ever had. It stayed in my nose for five days, then went to my throat. Finally I woke up one morning with no voice at all, and they had to shut down for the day."

According to Backstage, the film makers were the first to use a "flash" process developed by Movielab to bring out detail when shooting with low light in the tunnel. The process reportedly increased film speed by two stops. It allowed the film makers to use fewer lights and generators and cut five days out of the schedule.

At least two R22 trains portrayed Pelham 1-2-3. As it enters 28th Street station, the head car is labeled 7339. However, in an early scene at Grand Central, 7339 is seen on the express track across the platform. Later, after being cut from the rest of the train, the head car is labeled 7434. R22 cars first went into service in April 1957 and the vast majority of the 450 cars were scrapped in 1987.

After two months in the tunnel, production moved to Filmways Studios at 246 East 127th Street in East Harlem, where a replica of the Transit Authority's Brooklyn control center was constructed. Built around 1920 as Cosmopolitan Studios, the facility was leased in 1928 by MGM for sound production and purchased by Filmways in 1959. Among later films shot there were Butterfield 8 (1960), The Godfather (1972), The Wiz (1978), and Manhattan (1979). The building was demolished in the 1980s.

The exterior street scenes above the hijacked subway train were filmed at the subway entrance at 28th and Park Avenue South in Manhattan. The mayor's residence, Gracie Mansion, was used for exteriors. Wave Hill, a nineteenth-century mansion overlooking the Hudson in Riverdale, Bronx, was used for the interior scenes set in Gracie Mansion.

Music
The Jerry Fielding and Don Ellis sounding score, composed and conducted by David Shire, "layers explosive horn arrangements and serpentine keyboard riffs over a rhythm section that pits hard-grooving basslines against constantly shifting but always insistent layers of percussion". Shire used the 12-tone composition method to create unusual, somewhat dissonant melodic elements. The soundtrack album was the first CD release by Film Score Monthly and was later released by Retrograde Records. The end titles contain a more expansive arrangement of the theme, courtesy of Shire's wife at the time, Talia Shire, who suggested that he end the score with a more traditional ode to New York.

Release
The Taking of Pelham One Two Three was released on October 2, 1974.

Critical reception
The film was well received by critics. Variety called it "a good action caper" but "the major liability is Peter Stone's screenplay, which develops little interest in either Matthau or Shaw's gang, nor the innocent hostages" which are "simply stereotyped baggage". While the trade paper complained that the Mayor was "played for silly laughs", it called Shaw "superb in another versatile characterization".

BoxOffice thought that "some of the excitement has been lost" translating the novel to the screen, but "there is entertainment value in Peter Stone's screenplay".

Nora Sayre of The New York Times thought it captured the mood of New York and New Yorkers. "Throughout there's a skillful balance between the vulnerability of New Yorkers and the drastic, provocative sense of comedy that thrives all over our sidewalks. And the hijacking seems like a perfectly probable event for this town. (Perhaps the only element of fantasy is the implication that the city's departments could function so smoothly together). Meanwhile, the movie adds up to a fine piece of reporting—and it's the only action picture I've seen this year that has a rousing plot."

The film was one of several released that year that gave New York a bad image, including Law and Disorder, Death Wish, Serpico, and The Super Cops. Vincent Canby, another New York Times critic, wrote, "New York is a mess, say these films. It's run by fools. Its citizens are at the mercy of its criminals who, as often as not, are protected by an unholy alliance of civil libertarians and crooked cops. The air is foul. The traffic impossible. Services are diminishing and the morale is such that ordering a cup of coffee in a diner can turn into a request for a fat lip." But The Taking of Pelham One Two Three, "compared to the general run of New York City films, is practically a tonic, a good-humored, often witty suspense melodrama in which the representatives of law and decency triumph without bending the rules."

The Boston Globe called it "fast, funny and fairly terrifying", and "a nerve-racking ride", and appreciated the "wry humor" of Stone's script. It tapped into a darker reality: "A short time ago subways were safe; today some of them are full of the dark rage of asylums. And who really is to say a Pelham-type incident is out of the question?"

Charles Champlin of the Los Angeles Times called it "coarse-textured and effective, a cartoon-vivid melodrama and not, it's nice to know, a case study of psychopathic behavior. 'Pelham' is in fact the best to date of the new multiple-jeopardy capers, fresh, lively and suspenseful... . There are some marvelously managed scenes in the subway tunnels and on teeming platforms and at the barricaded street-level entrances. The subway nerve center is fascinating, and indeed one of the pleasures of the film is its glimpse of how things work... . The violence is handled with restraint; the dangers are mixed with raucous humor and what stays clear is that the aim is swift entertainment."

Roger Ebert's contemporary review gave the film 3 out of a possible 4 stars. He praised the film's "unforced realism", and the supporting characters who elevated what could have been a predictable crime thriller: "we care about the people not the plot mechanics. And what could have been formula trash turns out to be fairly classy trash, after all."
 
Gene Siskel also gave the film 3 out of 4 stars, describing it as a "solid new thriller laced with equal amounts of tension and comedy."

The film holds a 100% score on Rotten Tomatoes based on 41 reviews and a weighted average of 8.2/10. The site's consensus reads: "Breezy, thrilling, and quite funny, The Taking of Pelham One Two Three sees Walter Matthau and Robert Shaw pitted against each other in effortlessly high form".

Accolades
BAFTA Awards
 1976: Nominated, "Best Film Music"—David Shire
 1976: Nominated, "Best Supporting Actor"—Martin Balsam

Writers Guild of America Award
 1975: Nominated, "Best Drama Adapted from Another Medium"—Peter Stone

Remakes
In 1998, the film was remade as a television film with the same title, with Edward James Olmos in the Matthau role and Vincent D'Onofrio replacing Shaw as the senior hijacker. Although not particularly well received by critics or viewers, this version was reportedly more faithful to the book, though it revised the setting with new technologies.. It was filmed in Toronto, Ontario and is jokingly referred as “The Taking of Bloor Street 123”.

Another remake set in a post 9/11 New York City directed by Tony Scott and starring Denzel Washington and John Travolta, was released in 2009 to mixed reviews.

See also
 List of American films of 1974
 The Day of the Wolves, a 1971 film
 The Incident (1967).
 List of films with a 100% rating on Rotten Tomatoes

References

External links

 
 
 
 

1974 films
1970s action thriller films
1970s crime thriller films
American action thriller films
American crime thriller films
Films about extortion
Films about hijackings
Films about murderers
Films based on American novels
Films based on thriller novels
Films based on works by Morton Freedgood
Films directed by Joseph Sargent
Films scored by David Shire
Films set on the New York City Subway
Films about hostage takings
American police detective films
United Artists films
1970s English-language films
1970s American films